The Man Who Came to Dinner is a comedy play by George S. Kaufman and Moss Hart. It debuted on October 16, 1939, at the Music Box Theatre in New York City, where it ran until 1941, closing after 739 performances. It then enjoyed a number of New York and London revivals. The first London production was staged at The Savoy Theatre starring Robert Morley and Coral Browne. In 1990, Browne stated in a televised biographical interview, broadcast on UK Channel 4 (entitled Caviar to the General), that she bought the rights to the play, borrowing money from her dentist to do so. When she died, her will revealed that she had received royalties for all future productions and adaptations.

Synopsis

The play is set in the small town of Mesalia, Ohio in the weeks leading to Christmas in the late 1930s. The famously outlandish New York City radio wit Sheridan Whiteside ('Sherry' to his friends) is invited to dine at the house of the well-to-do factory owner Ernest W. Stanley and his family. But before Whiteside can enter the house, he slips on a patch of ice outside the Stanleys' front door and injures his hip. Confined to the Stanleys' home, Whiteside is looked after by several professionals: Dr. Bradley, the absent-minded town physician, Miss Preen, his frantic nurse, and Maggie Cutler, his faithful secretary. 

Confined to the house for a month, Whiteside drives his hosts mad by viciously insulting them, monopolizing their house and staff, running up large phone bills, and receiving many bizarre guests, including paroled convicts, and the eccentric Professor Metz, who brings him a glass-encased cockroach colony.  Although he earns the intense dislike of Mr. Stanley, Whiteside manages to befriend his adult children, June and Richard, as well as his wildly eccentric older sister, Harriet Stanley.

He also befriends local newspaperman and aspiring playwright Bert Jefferson but soon learns that Maggie has fallen in love with Bert, and plans to leave her job to marry him.  Unable to bear the thought of losing his secretary, Whiteside invites his friend, the glamorous and loose-living actress Lorraine Sheldon, to Mesalia to look at Bert's new play, hoping she can break up the marriage plans.  Dr. Bradley tells Whiteside he was mistaken in his diagnosis, and Whiteside is well enough to leave.  Whiteside buys the doctor's silence by pretending to want to work on a book with him, and for the rest of the play keeps brushing him off.

Whiteside encourages June Stanley to elope with a young union organizer whom her father disapproves of, and Richard to run away and pursue his dream of becoming a photographer. Lorraine arrives, and Maggie instantly suspects Whiteside's efforts to interfere with her and Bert.  Whiteside and Maggie then receive a visit from their friend, noted British actor and playwright Beverly Carlton.  Maggie learns Beverly can do a great impression of Lord Bottomley, an English lord whom Lorraine is desperate to marry.  She gets Beverly to call Lorraine from the train station and pretend to be Lord Bottomley proposing, to get Lorraine to leave.  However, Lorraine soon sees through the ruse.  When Lorraine realizes Maggie's involvement she starts to seduce Bert as revenge.

The next day, Christmas, Bert is enthralled with Lorraine, and Maggie, hurt by Whiteside's betrayal, tells him she is quitting.  Feeling guilty, Sherry tries to think of a way to get Lorraine out of Mesalia.  He gets help from an unexpected visit by his friend, movie comedian Banjo.  Mr. Stanley, however, furious at Whiteside's interference with his family, has now ordered Sherry's eviction from the house and gives him fifteen minutes to leave.  All looks hopeless until an Egyptian mummy case is delivered to Whiteside (a Christmas gift from the Khedive of Egypt).  Whiteside and Banjo manage to trick Lorraine into the mummy case and shut her inside.  Sherry then sees a photo of Harriet Stanley when she was younger, and recognizes her as a famous axe murderer.  Using this information, he blackmails Mr. Stanley into helping them get the case onto Banjo's plane.

Whiteside now stands, telling Maggie she is free to marry Bert and prepares to return to New York by train.  Unfortunately, as he is leaving the house, he slips on another patch of ice, injuring himself again.  He is carried back inside the house screaming as the curtain falls.

Influence of Alexander Woollcott
Kaufman and Hart wrote the play as a vehicle for their friend Alexander Woollcott, the model for the lead character Sheridan Whiteside. At the time the play was written Woollcott was famous both as the theater critic who helped re-launch the career of the Marx Brothers and as the star of the national radio show The Town Crier. He was well liked by both Kaufman and Hart, but that did not stop him from displaying the obnoxious characteristics displayed by Whiteside in the play. Kaufman and Hart had promised a vehicle for Woollcott but had been unable to find a plot that suited them until one day Woollcott showed up, unannounced, at Hart's Bucks County estate, and proceeded to take over the house. He slept in the master bedroom, terrorized Hart's staff, and generally acted like Sheridan Whiteside.  On his way out he wrote in Hart's guest book, "This is to certify that I had one of the most unpleasant times I ever spent." Hart related the story to Kaufman soon afterwards. As they were both laughing about it, Hart remarked that he was lucky that Woollcott had not broken his leg and become stuck there. Kaufman looked at Hart and the idea was born.

A plot point mentions actress and Broadway producer Katharine Cornell. The character Bert Jefferson writes a play, and Whiteside promises to give it to Cornell for her to star in. The character of Professor Metz is after Gustav Eckstein, MD, a physician writer from Cincinnati who studied animal behavior and was a long-time friend of Alexander Woollcott.

Woollcott was delighted with The Man Who Came to Dinner and was offered the role for its Broadway debut. With his busy schedule of radio broadcasts and lectures, he declined, and Monty Woolley played the part on stage and in the subsequent film adaptation. Woollcott did play Whiteside in the West Coast version of the play and was even joined by Harpo Marx, who portrayed his own referenced character, Banjo.

The printed edition of the play starts with the inscription "To Alexander Woollcott, for reasons that are nobody's business."

Casts

Character notes
 Sheridan Whiteside was modeled on Alexander Woollcott.
Beverly Carlton was modeled on Noël Coward.
Banjo was modeled on Harpo Marx, and there is a dialogue reference to his brothers Groucho and Chico. When Sheridan Whiteside talks to Banjo on the phone, he asks him, "How are Wackko and Sloppo?"
Professor Metz was based on Dr. Gustav Eckstein of Cincinnati (with cockroaches substituted for canaries)
Lorraine Sheldon was modeled after Gertrude Lawrence.
The character of Harriet Sedley, the alias of Harriet Stanley, is an homage to Lizzie Borden. The popular jump-rope rhyme immortalizing Borden is parodied in the play.

Adaptations

Film
The production was adapted for a 1942 feature film, scripted by Philip G. Epstein and Julius J. Epstein and directed by William Keighley. The film featured Monty Woolley, Bette Davis, Ann Sheridan, Billie Burke, Jimmy Durante, Mary Wickes and Richard Travis. It had its world premiere at the Capitol Theater in Paragould, Arkansas.

Radio
The Man Who Came to Dinner was presented on Philip Morris Playhouse July 10, 1942. Monty Woolley starred in the adaptation. It was broadcast again by Theatre Guild on the Air on ABC Radio November 17, 1946 starring Fred Allen. In 1949, The Man Who Came to Dinner was produced for CBS Radio for The Hotpoint Holiday Hour. The production starred Charles Boyer, Jack Benny, Gene Kelly, Gregory Peck, Dorothy McGuire, and Rosalind Russell. It was also adapted for the Lux Radio Theater on March 27, 1950, starring Clifton Webb as Sheridan Whiteside and Lucille Ball as Maggie Cutler. The show was hosted by William Keighley, who directed the 1942 film adaptation.

For Christmas Day, 2000, BBC Radio 4 broadcast a Marcy Kahan adaptation of The Man Who Came to Dinner approved by the Hart and Kaufman estates which starred Simon Callow as Whiteside, Elizabeth McGovern as Maggie, with Conleth Hill as Bert Jefferson, Cheryl Campbell as Lorraine Sheldon, John Sessions as Banjo and Professor Metz, Colin Stinton as Mr. Stanley, and Malcolm Sinclair as Beverley Carlton. Moira Petty, writing in The Stage, said, "Director Ned Chaillet elicited from his cast ... a smart, gag-telling pace, which gave it a sensational period flavour."

Musical
The play and subsequent film served as the basis for the 1967 musical Sherry!, with a  book and lyrics by James Lipton and music by Laurence Rosenthal. Clive Revill starred as Sheridan Whiteside.  The show ran on Broadway for 72 performances. Years later, the musical was recorded with a studio cast led by Nathan Lane as Sheridan.

Television
On October 13, 1954, a 60-minute adaptation was aired on the CBS Television series The Best of Broadway.
A Hallmark Hall of Fame production, adapted by Sam Denoff and Bill Persky and directed by Buzz Kulik, was broadcast by NBC on November 29, 1972. The production starred Orson Welles, who was "a marvelous friend" of Woollcott's and had been offered the role of Sheridan Whiteside in both the original stage production and the 1942 film. Welles later said he was "very smart [to have declined]; because if you've seen the film you'll know it was awful and there was no way for anybody to be good in it." Welles's costars were Lee Remick (Maggie Cutler), Joan Collins (Lorraine Sheldon), Don Knotts (Dr. Bradley), and Marty Feldman (Banjo).  The New York Times criticized Denoff's updating of the original play (Welles's Whiteside was a television personality competing with Johnny Carson) and listed the production in its 1972 "Worst of Television" list.
The 2000 Broadway revival was broadcast by the PBS series Stage on Screen on October 7, 2000, three days after the New York production closed, and was released on DVD.

Broadway revivals
A 1980 revival directed by Stephen Porter ran for 19 previews and 85 performances at the Circle in the Square Theatre. The cast included Ellis Rabb, Roderick Cook, Leonard Frey, Carrie Nye, and Jamey Sheridan. Drama Desk Award nominations went to Cook for Outstanding Featured Actor in a Play and Nye for Outstanding Featured Actress in a Play.

A 2000 revival, which ran for 85 performances, was produced by the Roundabout Theatre Company and directed by Jerry Zaks. The cast included Nathan Lane (Sheridan Whiteside), Jean Smart (Lorraine Sheldon), Harriet Sansom Harris (Maggie Cutler), and Lewis J. Stadlen (Banjo). In an interview prior to the opening, Lane said, "There's a danger in playing Whiteside. In the movie, Monty Woolley's portrayal at times came across as mean for mean's sake.  It's when it gets nasty or bitchy that it goes off in the wrong direction." He suggested that his performance was influenced by Woollcott's repressed sexuality, stating, "He had a lot of...things he didn't want to deal with." The production received mixed reviews. Variety, The Advocate and Talkin' Broadway reviewed it positively, and Entertainment Weekly gave the production a B+, calling it "as fresh a send-up as an SNL sketch and [with] an even more inspired plot" and singling out Smart's "swanning demonstration of ultimate showbiz phoniness" for praise.  In The New York Times, however, Ben Brantley disliked the production, writing that "What should be a buoyant balloon of an evening [is] more often an exercise in deflation." Brantley praised Stadlen but found most of the acting, including Lane's, to be "a series of flourishes that sell individual jokes and epigrams without being anchored to character."

Smart was nominated for the Tony Award for Best Actress in a Play and Stadlen was nominated for the Drama Desk Award for Outstanding Featured Actor in a Play, though neither won. The production was filmed and televised by Great Performances on PBS.

In popular culture
Alternative rock singer Morrissey quoted the play's "All those people, all those lives, where are they now" monologue in The Smiths' 1986 song "Cemetry Gates", and used the pseudonym "Sheridan Whiteside" when writing record reviews before his musical career began.

References
Notes

External links
The Man Who Came to Dinner at the Internet Broadway Database
1946 Theatre Guild on the Air radio adaptation of play at Internet Archive

1939 plays
Broadway plays
American plays adapted into films
Plays by George S. Kaufman
Plays by Moss Hart
Plays set in Ohio